Monster is the fourth and final studio album by the American Alternative rock band Fetchin Bones, released on June 9, 1989 through Capitol Records.

Reception 

Monster proved to be the band's most successful release, peaking at #175 on the Billboard charts and producing the popular single "Love Crushing". Tommy Steele was nominated the Grammy Award for Best Recording Package for his artwork on the album. Tom Demalon of allmusic gave it 3 out of 5 stars, praising the emotion depth of the lyrics and noting that "the quintet doesn't let up often, serving up a punk-tinged, power pop musical backdrop for the strafing vocals of Hope Nicholls."

Track listing 
All songs composed by Fetchin Bones

Chart positions 

Album

Singles

Personnel 

Fetchin Bones
 Hope Nicholls – vocals
 Danna Pentes – bass guitar, violin
 Aaron Pitkin – guitar
 Clay Richardson – drums
 Errol Stewart – guitar

Additional musicians and production
 Jay David Buchsbaum – photography
 Tim Carr – executive production
 Jim Dineen – executive engineering
 Paul Hamingson – engineering
 Gina Immel – executive engineering
 Ed Stasium – production
 Tom Whalley – executive production

External links 
 Video of the single Love Crushing

References 

Fetchin Bones albums
1989 albums
Capitol Records albums
Albums produced by Ed Stasium